The Baltic Gas Interconnector was a project of the natural gas submarine pipeline between Germany, Denmark and Sweden. The pipeline would connect the existing pipeline networks of southern Scandinavian and Continental European countries in order to secure uninterrupted supply of natural gas.

Route
In Germany, landfall of the pipeline was to be in Rostock area. The German onshore section was to include a compressor station and a connection to the existing gas network. The Danish landing point was to be in Avedøre, and the pipeline was planned to connect with the Avedøre power plant.

Technical features

The consortium to build the Baltic Gas Interconnector consisted of DONG Energy (originally Energi E2), Hovedstadsregionens Naturgas (HNG), VNG - Verbundnetz Gas AG, E.ON Sverige AB, Göteborgs Energi, Lunds Energi and Öresundskraft.

Feasibility study
The feasibility study which was completed in 2001 included market assessment, seabed survey, offshore and onshore installations estimated total cost to be €225 million ($202.3 million). The pipeline was scheduled to become operational circa 2004–2005. Environmental impact assessment started in 2002. Authorization from Swedish government was given in 2004, by Denmark – in 2005. The last phase of authorization was to come from Germany, in 2006. The project has not been implemented yet.

During the initial stages of the project, gas was planned to transported from the North Sea which is now in depletion. Consequently, Russian gas has been considered as an alternative source for the pipeline. However, due to considerations for linking Nord Stream 1 pipeline to Swedish pipeline network, implementation of BGI is being revisited.

References

External links

Baltic Gas Interconnector (archive page)

Pipelines under the Baltic Sea
Natural gas pipelines in Denmark
Natural gas pipelines in Sweden
Natural gas pipelines in Germany
Cancelled energy infrastructure
Denmark–Germany relations
Denmark–Sweden relations
Germany–Sweden relations